S. Barkatali was an Indian civil servant and administrator. He was the administrator of Mahe from 8 November 1958 to 21 August 1960.

References 

 

Year of birth missing
Possibly living people
Administrators of Mahe